Kořenice is a municipality and village in Kolín District in the Central Bohemian Region of the Czech Republic. It has about 600 inhabitants.

Administrative parts
Villages of Chotouchov and Pučery are administrative parts of Kořenice.

References

Villages in Kolín District